Hypselis or Hypsela, known to the ancient Egyptians as Shashotep, is an ancient Egyptian city and Roman bishopric, which was located near the modern town of Shutb (or ash-Shatb, Chutb) in the Asyut Governorate.

History

Antiquity

Shashotep is first mentioned in texts dating back to the First Intermediate Period. During the subsequent Middle Kingdom it was the main town of the 11th Upper Egyptian nome. The main deity of ancient Shashotep was Khnum, who was sometimes called "Lord of Shashotep". The cemeteries near the modern place Rifeh, once belonged to the town. Later, the city became known by the Greeks as Hypselis.

Titular see 
During Roman time, and before fading into the desert, the city became one of the suffragan sees of the Metropolitan Archdiocese of Antinoë, capital of the province of Thebais Prima. The diocese was nominally restored in 1933 as Latin Titular bishopric by the names of Hypselis / Ipseli. It is vacant since 1997, following the death of its last bishop, Jesús Serrano Pastor.

See also 
 List of ancient Egyptian towns and cities
 List of Catholic dioceses in Egypt
 Apollonopolis Parva (Hypselis)

References 

Catholic titular sees in Africa
Cities in ancient Egypt
Former populated places in Egypt
Suppressed Roman Catholic dioceses